"I Luv It" is a song from American hip hop ensemble Tha Eastsidaz, released on 2001 as the single from studio album Duces 'n Trayz: The Old Fashioned Way.

Track listing

Chart performance

References 

2001 singles
2001 songs
TVT Records singles
Gangsta rap songs
Songs written by Arthur Baker (musician)
Songs written by Snoop Dogg
Songs written by George Clinton (funk musician)
Songs written by Bootsy Collins
Songs written by John Robie
Songs written by Bernie Worrell
Song recordings produced by Battlecat (record producer)
Songs written by Battlecat (record producer)